The Shelley Memorial is a memorial to the English poet Percy Bysshe Shelley (1792–1822) at University College, Oxford, England, the college that he briefly attended and from which he was expelled for writing the 1811 pamphlet "The Necessity of Atheism".

Although Shelley was expelled from the college, he remains one of its most famous alumni and is now held in high honour there. In 2005, the college acquired some of Shelley's letters to further enhance its connection with the poet.

Statue
The memorial consists of a white marble sculpture of a reclining nude and dead Shelley washed up on the shore at Viareggio in Italy after his drowning, sculpted by Edward Onslow Ford, associated with the New Sculpture movement. It is set on a decorative plinth in a small domed late Victorian room designed by Basil Champneys, behind ornamental railings that protect it from students.

The statue was commissioned by Shelley's daughter-in-law, Lady Shelley. It was originally intended to be located in the Protestant Cemetery in Rome where Shelley is buried, at the request of adventurer Edward John Trelawny, a friend of Shelley. Trelawny wanted to have a monument of the poet next to his own. However, Trelawny's descendants thought that Ford's statue was too large and thus did not consent to his wishes. Eventually the statue ended up at University College, donated by Lady Shelley, with a formal opening ceremony on 14 June 1893. Among others, Lady Shelley, Onslow Ford, Champneys and Benjamin Jowett were present at the opening ceremony.

The memorial has been the victim of a number of pranks over the years. The college's chemistry don, E. J. Bowen, had to clean paint off the statue, for example. The room in which it is housed has also been flooded and infested with goldfish.
The statue was a key element in the meeting of two main characters in the 1997 film The Saint, starring Val Kilmer and Elisabeth Shue, and also features in an episode (And the Moonbeams Kiss the Sea) of the British TV drama, Lewis.

Boyle–Hooke plaque

The Shelley Memorial is on the site where the scientists Robert Boyle and Robert Hooke performed experiments while they were in Oxford, previously Cross Hall until the early 19th century. This is recorded for passers-by, on a plaque on the exterior wall of the memorial in the High Street, that reads:

See also
 Keats–Shelley Memorial House, Rome, Italy
 Oxford Spanish Civil War memorial

References

External links

 Shelley Memorial All Washed Up article from Cherwell

1893 sculptures
1893 establishments in England
University College, Oxford
Monuments and memorials in Oxfordshire
Buildings and structures of the University of Oxford
History of the University of Oxford
Culture of the University of Oxford
Tourist attractions in Oxford
Sculptures in England
Marble sculptures in the United Kingdom
Individual rooms
Domes
English poetry
Statues of writers
Cultural depictions of Percy Bysshe Shelley